Fluralaner (INN) is a systemic insecticide and acaricide that is administered orally or topically. The U.S. Food and Drug Administration (FDA) approved it under the trade name Bravecto for flea treatment in dogs in May 2014 and Bravecto Plus as a topical treatment for cats in November 2019, with warnings about possible side effects in both species.  The EU approved the drug in February 2014. Australia approved it for the treatment and prevention of ticks and fleas on dogs in January 2015.

Mode of action
Fluralaner inhibits γ-aminobutyric acid (GABA)-gated chloride channels (GABA receptors) and L-glutamate-gated chloride channels (GluCls). Potency of fluralaner is comparable to fipronil (a related GABA-antagonist insecticide and acaricide).

Research 
Fluralaner is being investigated to determine its ability to reduce the incidence of mosquito-borne diseases  as well as bedbugs.

References 

Benzamides
Chloroarenes
Insecticides
Merck & Co. brands
Isoxazolines
Trifluoromethyl compounds
GABAA receptor negative allosteric modulators
Convulsants